Charles Greenaway (died 25 November 1859) was a British Whig politician.

Greenaway was elected a Whig Member of Parliament for Leominster at the 1837 general election, and held the seat until 1845 when he resigned by accepting the office of Steward of the Chiltern Hundreds.

References

External links
 

UK MPs 1837–1841
UK MPs 1841–1847
Whig (British political party) MPs for English constituencies
1859 deaths